The Asian Sun is a 1921 German silent film directed by Edmund Heuberger and starring Henry Sze, Paul Otto and Irena Marga.

Cast
Henry Sze as Kuen-Li
Paul Otto as Head of the prison
Irena Marga as white girl
Victor Varconi as secretary
Aruth Wartan
Colette Corder as daughter of the Head of the prison
Vladimir Agayev
Ilja Dubrowski
Nien Soen Ling
Curth Muth

References

External links

Films of the Weimar Republic
Films directed by Edmund Heuberger
German silent feature films
German black-and-white films